A glove is a type of garment or utility which is designed to cover the human hand.

Glove(s) or The Glove may also refer to:

Film
 The Glove (film), a 1979 cult action film
 Glove (film) (글러브), a 2011 South Korean baseball film

Music
 Gloves (album), a 2010 album by the band Operator Please
 The Glove (Schiller), a 1797 ballad by Friedrich Schiller
 The Glove (Waterhouse), a 2005 composition of Schiller's ballad by Graham Waterhouse
 The Glove, a musical supergroup featuring Robert Smith of The Cure and Steven Severin of Siouxsie & the Banshees

Other uses
 Gauntlet (gloves), a form of glove used for purposes including military, science, industry and drumming
 GloVe (machine learning), an unsupervised learning algorithm for obtaining vector representations for words
 The Glove, nickname of American basketball player Gary Payton
 The Glove, nickname of American music producer Chris Taylor
 GLOVE: OpenGL ES over Vulkan, middleware used with the Vulkan graphics API

See also
 Glover (disambiguation)
 Golden Gloves (disambiguation)